Muzaffar ad-Din Musa ibn Muhanna (died November 1341) was the amir al-ʿarab (commander of the Bedouin tribes) in Syria and lord of Salamiyah and Palmyra under the Mamluks in 1335–November 1341. He was the chieftain of the Tayyid clan of Al Fadl, having succeeded his father Muhanna ibn Isa. Musa maintained close relations with Sultan an-Nasir Muhammad and cooperated with him during Muhanna's defection to the Mongol Ilkhanate and later during his own reign. In return for Musa's support and supply of noble Arabian horses, an-Nasir Muhammad granted substantial, high-income iqtaʿat (fiefs) in Syria.

Biography
Musa was the son of Muhanna ibn Isa and grandson of Isa ibn Muhanna of the Al Fadl. The latter were a clan of the Banu Rabi'a, which was a branch of the Banu Jarrah, itself part of the large tribe of Tayy, which dominated the desert and steppe region between the Euphrates valley in the north to central Najd in the south. Muhanna served as amir al-ʿarab and lord of Salamiyah and Palmyra under the Mamluk Sultanate. During his reign, in 1311–1312, he defected to the Mongol Ilkhanate, but Musa remained loyal to the Mamluk sultan, an-Nasir Muhammad. Despite Musa's loyalty, the sultan appointed Muhanna's brother Fadl ibn Isa as amir al-ʿarab in his stead. Nonetheless, Musa was given an annual stipend and regularly visited the sultan in Cairo.

Musa succeeded his father as amir al-ʿarab in 1335. That year, Musa threatened an-Nasir Muhammad that he would lead a Bedouin rebellion against him if he did not restore iqtaʿat (fiefs; sing. iqtaʿ) to the Al Fadl that were previously confiscated by the family; the iqtaʿat had been redistributed to finance the Mamluk emirs and soldiers fighting on the frontier with Lesser Armenia. An-Nasir Muhammad ultimately obliged out of fear of a mass Bedouin defection to the Ilkhanate. To avoid a potential mutiny of the Mamluk troops fighting in Armenia, the Mamluk governor of Aleppo promised to intercede on their behalf and regain the iqtaʿat, but an-Nasir Muhammad remained committed to Musa. An-Nasir Muhammad was unprecedentedly enamored with the Bedouin and particularly sought the finest Arabian horses they bred. In 1337, he granted Musa an iqtaʿ whose income was one million silver dirhams in return for a single horse. A few months later, an-Nasir Muhammad paid 560,000 dirhams to Musa in exchange for several horses.

Musa collaborated with an-Nasir Muhammad to arrest the Mamluk viceroy of Syria, Tankiz al-Husami. Musa guaranteed his Bedouin forces would prevent Tankiz from fleeing should the sultan's troops fail to apprehend him. Musa departed Cairo after his meeting with the sultan and took command of his horsemen who were on standby near Homs. In the end, Musa's assistance did not prove necessary as Tankiz surrendered in early 1340 at the approach of the Mamluk army from Safad. Musa died in November 1341 and was succeeded by his brother Sulayman. Later in the 14th century, Musa's son Umar and grandson Zamil held the post.

Notes

References

Bibliography

1341 deaths
14th-century people from the Mamluk Sultanate
Tayy
Rulers of Palmyra
Bedouin tribal chiefs
Arabs from the Mamluk Sultanate